Isabel Blaesi (born April 1, 1990) is a Filipina actress. She is well known for playing the role Lisa in Abt Ur Luv.

Early life
Blaesi was born to a Swiss father Robert Blaesi, a watchmaker, and a Filipina mother Susan. She studied in Switzerland from fourth grade until her sophomore year.

When Blaesi went back to the Philippines, she decided to go in the showbiz just like her sister, Andrea of Star Magic Batch 2.

Career

Isabel was one of the lucky questors of the first Star Circle Quest.  She was on the top 20 questors but then she failed to make it to the top 10. After getting booted she signed a contract with Star Magic and later on was launched as a member of Star Magic Batch 13.

Filmography

References

External links

1990 births
Filipino child actresses
Filipino television actresses
Filipino people of Swiss descent
Living people
Star Magic
Star Circle Quest participants